"Nobody's Gonna Rain on Our Parade" is a song written by Will Rambeaux and Brad Parker, and recorded by American country music artist Kathy Mattea. It was released in July 1994 as the second single from the album Walking Away a Winner.  The song reached number 13 on the Billboard Hot Country Singles & Tracks chart and peaked at number 8 on the Canadian RPM Country Tracks chart.

Music video
The music video was directed by Steven Goldmann and premiered in 1994.

Chart performance
"Nobody's Gonna Rain on Our Parade" debuted at number 71 on the U.S. Billboard Hot Country Singles & Tracks for the week of July 23, 1994.

Year-end charts

References

1994 singles
Kathy Mattea songs
Song recordings produced by Josh Leo
Music videos directed by Steven Goldmann
Mercury Records singles
1994 songs
Songs written by Will Rambeaux